Pyong Gap Min (born 18 February 1942) is a sociologist, currently a Distinguished Professor of Sociology at City University of New York, Director of the Research Center for Korean Community at Queens College and also a published author. In 2012, he was awarded the Distinguished Career Award by the American Sociological Association.

Work(s) 

   (1st ed.; 1995),  (2nd ed.; 2006); ; .

References

1942 births
Living people
City University of New York faculty
American sociologists
Queens College, City University of New York faculty
Graduate Center, CUNY faculty
American political writers
Georgia State University alumni
Seoul National University alumni